The Hon. Charlotte Helen Long (9 October 1965 – 6 October 1984) was an English aristocrat and child actress, the youngest daughter of the 4th Viscount Long.

Born in Devizes, Wiltshire, she attended the Stonar School, Atworth, and then Fitzmaurice Grammar School until its closure in 1980 and then St Laurence Comprehensive School, both in Bradford on Avon, Wiltshire.

Long played Alison in the television adaptations of Peter Glidewell's Schoolgirl Chums and St. Ursula's in Danger in 1982 and 1983 respectively. Later she appeared in the 1984 film The Chain.

She played Eloise de Ricordeau in the first series of the BBC Drama The Tripods but was killed before filming the second series. She died three days after sustaining injuries in an accident on the M4 motorway, when a lorry crashed into her parked car after it had broken down. Her passenger survived with only minor injuries. The resulting inquest heard that the lorry driver had sneezed, causing his vehicle to crash into her car while it was parked on the hard shoulder. She was replaced by Cindy Shelley for the second series of The Tripods.

See also
Juanita Coco, an Australian child singer who was killed in an accident whilst still a teenager
Jessica Jacobs, an Australian child actress and singer who was killed in an accident whilst still a teenager

References

External links

1965 births
1984 deaths
English television actresses
Road incident deaths in England
Daughters of viscounts
Charlotte
People from Devizes
People educated at Fitzmaurice Grammar School
20th-century English actresses
20th-century English businesswomen
20th-century English businesspeople